The 1991 Ms. Olympia contest was an IFBB professional bodybuilding competition was held on October 12 and 13, 1991 at the Shrine Auditorium in Los Angeles, California. It was the 12th Ms. Olympia competition held.

Prizes
 1st $50,000
 2nd $20,000
 3rd $10,000
 4th $7,500
 5th $5,000
 6th $4,000
 7th $3,000
 8th $2,500
 9th $2,000
 10th $1,500

Results

Scorecard
ALSO COMPETED: Laura Beaudry, USA. Sandra Blackie, Canada. Audrey Harris, USA. Gillian Hodge, Trinidad and Tobago. Zuzana Kornakova, Czechoslovakia. Jutta Tippelt, Germany.

Notable Events

 The slimmest margin of victory for any Ms. Olympia, with Lenda Murray edging out Bev Francis by a final score of 31 to 32.
 This was the first Ms. Olympia contest to be televised live on ESPN.
 It was the largest audience ever witnessing a Ms. Olympia contest.
 The two emcees of the 1991 Ms. Olympia was Jake Steinfeld and Carla Dunlap-Kaan.
 Rachel McLish was awarded bodybuilding's Lifetime Achievement Award by Joe Weider.

See also
 1991 Mr. Olympia

References

 Ms. Olympia Turns 30
 1991 Ms. Olympia held in Los Angeles on October 13th
 BEV’S LAST STAND
 1991 Ms Olympia Results

External links
 Competitor History of the Ms. Olympia

Ms Olympia, 1991
1991 in bodybuilding
Ms. Olympia
Ms. Olympia
History of female bodybuilding